Mustek may refer to:
Můstek (Prague Metro), a Prague Metro station
Mustek Systems, a Taiwanese corporation
Mustek corp. aka Must trademark